Calytrix decandra, commonly known as the pink starflower, is a species of plant in the myrtle family Myrtaceae that is endemic to Western Australia.

It blooms between August and December producing pink-purple star shaped flowers.

Found on sandplains and among granite outcrops along the south coast in the Goldfields-Esperance region of Western Australia where it grows on sandy soils.

The species was first formally described by the botanist Candolle in 1828 in the work Prodromus Systematis Naturalis Regni Vegetabilis. It has also been described as Calycothrix candolleana by Johannes Conrad Schauer in 1843 in Monographia Myrtacearum Xerocarpicarum, as Calycothrix conanthera by Ferdinand von Mueller in 1859 in Fragmenta Phytographiae Australiae and as Calytrix candolleana George Bentham in 1867 in Orders XLVIII. Myrtaceae- LXII. Compositae in Flora Australiensis.

References

Plants described in 1828
decandra
Flora of Western Australia